John McNair is the name of:

 John B. McNair, Premier of New Brunswick
 John Frederick Adolphus McNair, British civil servant based in India
 John McNair (congressman), from Pennsylvania
 John McNair (UK politician), General Secretary of the Independent Labour Party

See also
 John McNairy, American judge